Acholi nationalism is a political ideology that seeks self-determination by the Acholi people. A notable proponent of Acholi nationalism is the Lord’s Resistance Army, a  Christian extremist fundamentalist organization that operates in Uganda, the Central African Republic & the Democratic Republic of the Congo.

See also
Ugandan nationalism

References

Stateless nationalism in Africa
Political history of Uganda